Ravi Punia (born 7 February 1993)is an Indian Professional footballer who plays as a centre-back, for Rajasthan United FC in the I-League.

Career

Early career 
Born in Charkhi Dadri, Haryana, he started playing football during his school days for the Army School team. From the Army School Team, he was selected to play for the district team of Hisar district, Haryana. He has got experience of playing in many states in India. He has won inter-university football championship in 2016 ( Gold Medal ). He also got an opportunity of captainship during his tenure at Jaipur's Vijay FC side.

Club career 
He made his debut for Rajasthan United FC during I-League Qualifiers 2021, later Rajasthan United FC qualified for I-League 2021–2022 season.

References 

Living people
Indian footballers
I-League 2nd Division players
I-League players
Footballers from Haryana
Footballers from Rajasthan
Association football defenders
1993 births
Rajasthan United FC players